The 2007 Wake Forest Demon Deacons football team represented Wake Forest University during the 2007 NCAA Division I FBS football season.  The team was coached by Jim Grobe in his seventh season at the school and played its home games at BB&T Field. The team began its season with an Atlantic Coast Conference (ACC) game on Saturday, September 1, 2007 against Boston College. Wake Forest played its first season since winning the 2006 ACC championship, their first in 36 years.

Preseason
Following the most successful season in team history in 2006, the 2007 team was not widely predicted to win the ACC despite returning many offensive starters from 2006. Some sports writers stated that they believed 2006 to have been a fluke and that Wake Forest was not going to win as many games in 2007, especially because of the losses on defense, including the loss of linebacker Jon Abbate to the National Football League.  Wake Forest was picked to finish fourth in the Atlantic Division of the ACC in the annual preseason poll conducted by the Atlantic Coast Sports Media Association. Lindy's was the only major preseason magazine to pick Wake Forest as a Top-25 team.

Roster changes
Linebacker Eric Berry was ruled academically ineligible for the 2007 season.
Mike Rinfrette moved from fullback to linebacker in spring practice.

Recruiting
On National Signing Day, Wake Forest signed 20 recruits in all, eleven defensive players and nine offensive players.

Award candidates
Steve Justice (C)- 2007 Lombardi Trophy Watch List; 2007 Outland Trophy Watch List; 2007 Rimington Trophy Watch List 
Zac Selmon (TE)- 2007 Wuerffel Trophy Nominee 
Riley Skinner (QB) 2007 Maxwell Award Watch List; 2007 Davey O'Brien National Quarterback Award Watch List 
Sam Swank (P)- 2007 Ray Guy Award Watch List

Roster

Coaching staff

Schedule

Game summaries

@ Boston College

Nebraska

Army

Maryland

@ Duke

Florida State

@ Navy

North Carolina

@ Virginia

@ Clemson

NC State

@ Vanderbilt

vs. Connecticut

Postseason honors

Conference
Steve Justice (C)- 2007 Jacobs Blocking Trophy
All-ACC First Team
Kenneth Moore (WR)
Steve Justice (C)
Alphonso Smith (CB)
 
All-ACC Second Team
Josh Adams (RB)
Aaron Curry (LB)

All-ACC Honorable Mention
Chip Vaughn (S)
Sam Swank (K)
Kevin Marion (KR)

Josh Adams (RB)- 2007 ACC Rookie of the Year and 2007 ACC Offensive Rookie of the Year 
Matt Robinson (DE)- 2007 ACC Brian Piccolo Award

National
 Steve Justice (C) - 2007 Rimington Trophy Finalist
 2007 AFCA First Team All-American
 Louis Frazier (OT) - 2007 ESPN Academic All-American

References

Wake Forest
Wake Forest Demon Deacons football seasons
Duke's Mayo Bowl champion seasons
Wake Forest Demon Deacons football